The Pirangi River is a river of Ceará state in eastern Brazil.

See also
List of rivers of Ceará

External links
Ceará map in a tourist guide

Rivers of Ceará